"These Boots Are Made for Walkin' is a hit song written by Lee Hazlewood and recorded by American singer Nancy Sinatra. It charted on January 22, 1966, and reached No.1 in the United States Billboard Hot 100 and in the UK Singles Chart.

Subsequently, many cover versions of the song have been released in a range of styles: metal, pop, rock, punk rock, country, dance, and industrial. Among the more notable versions are the singles released by Megadeth, Billy Ray Cyrus and Jessica Simpson.

Nancy Sinatra version 
The song was written by Lee Hazlewood; it was inspired by a line spoken by Frank Sinatra in the comedy-western film 4 for Texas (1963): "They tell me them boots ain't built for walkin'."

Nancy Sinatra's version of the song was released as a single in December 1965, as the second song to be taken from her debut album, Boots (1966), and was a follow-up to the minor hit "So Long, Babe". The song became an instant success and, in late February 1966, it topped the Billboard Hot 100 chart, a move it replicated in similar charts across the world.

Billboard described the song as "fine folk-rock material" and praised Sinatra's vocal performance and "the Billy Strange driving dance beat." Cash Box described it as a "funky, slow-shufflin' folk-rocker about a gal who serves notice on her boyfriend that she can't be pushed around."

Recording 
Lee Hazlewood intended to record the song himself, saying that "it's not really a girl's song", but Sinatra talked him out of it, saying that "coming from a guy it was harsh and abusive, but was perfect for a little girl to sing". Hazlewood agreed. Sinatra's recording of the song was made with the help of Los Angeles session musicians known as the Wrecking Crew. This session included Chuck Berghofer on double bass, providing the notable bass line with its quarter-tone descent. The session was held on November 19, 1965, at United Western Recorders in Hollywood, and additionally produced the songs "Foursome" and "The City Never Sleeps at Night".

Promotional film 
In the same year, Sinatra recorded a promotional film, which would later be known as the music video, for the song. It was produced for Color-Sonics and played on Scopitone video jukeboxes. The film was directed by choreographer Robert Sidney and was produced by Official Films at Paramount Studios in Hollywood. In 1986, for the song's 20th anniversary, cable station VH1 played the video.

Sinatra told Alison Martino that other videos and performances are from TV shows like The Ed Sullivan Show, Hullaballoo and Shindig!  These other videos featured Sinatra wearing an iconic pair of red leather boots.

In popular culture 
The song was used by Stanley Kubrick for a scene in his 1987 film Full Metal Jacket, where a South Vietnamese prostitute in a miniskirt propositions a couple of American GIs.

A part of the song was sung by Juliette Lewis in Natural Born Killers.

The song was featured in the 1997 film "Austin Powers: International Man of Mystery"

In Family Guy season eight, episode 18, "Quagmire's Dad", Quagmire's father, Lt. Dan Quagmire used this song to make an entrance when meeting Peter and Joe.

The song was featured in the 2001 film, “The Mexican”.

In 2006, Pitchfork Media selected it as the 114th best song of the 1960s. Critic Tom Breihan described the song as "maybe the finest bitchy kiss-off in pop history".

Goodyear Tire and Rubber Company used portions of the song for its 1960s ad campaign promoting its "wide boots" tires. Nancy Sinatra unsuccessfully sued Goodyear for using the song, claiming that it had violated her publicity rights.

The song was featured in the 2018 film Ocean's Eight.

A portion of the song was used in the 2021 Disney film Cruella.

During the 1993 standoff in Waco, Texas between David Koresh and the FBI, the FBI played Sinatra's recording of the song on a loudspeaker in an attempt to torment Koresh and his followers in hopes they would surrender.

Track listing 
 UK promotional single
"These Boots Are Made for Walkin – 3:03
"The City Never Sleeps at Night" – 2:54

Personnel 
Other personnel, as seen in the American Federation of Musicians (AFM) contracts for the session include: 

 Chuck Berghofer – double bass
 Nick Bonney – guitar
 Eddie Brackett Jr. – engineer
 Roy V. Caton – (contractor) trumpet
 Jerry Cole – guitar
 Donald R. Frost – drums
 Lee Hazlewood – supervisor
 Plas Johnson – tenor sax
 Carol Kaye – Fender Precision bass
 Don Lanier – guitar
 William Miller – (no instrument listed)
 Oliver Mitchell – trumpet
 Lou Norell – guitar
 Richard Perissi – French horn
 William Pitman – guitar
 Don Randi – keyboard
 Emil Richards – percussion
 Billy Strange – arranger, conductor, and guitar

Despite multiple claims by Wrecking Crew drummer Hal Blaine that he played drums on the track, the contract shows he was not present at the session. Rather, it was Donald "Richie" Frost.

Charts

Weekly charts

Year-end charts

Certifications and sales

Release history

Billy Ray Cyrus version 

In 1992, Billy Ray Cyrus covered the song and included it on his debut album, Some Gave All (1992). Later, the cover was included on the compilations De Nationale Voorjaars CD 1993, Alle 40 goed – Country and The Definitive Collection.

Track listing 
CD-maxi
 "These Boots Are Made for Walkin'" – 2:48	
 "Ain't No Good Goodbye" – 3:22	
 "Could've Been Me" (acoustic mix) – 3:45

Charts

Jessica Simpson version 

Jessica Simpson recorded her own version of "These Boots Are Made for Walkin (and added her own lyrics) for the soundtrack to the film The Dukes of Hazzard (2005). The version was also included in the international version of her fifth studio album, A Public Affair (2006). Simpson's cover was co-produced by Jimmy Jam and Terry Lewis and was released as the soundtrack's first single on June 20, 2005. It became Simpson's fifth top-20 single in the United States, and its music video drew controversy because of its sexual imagery.

Recording and release 

Simpson's version of the song is performed from the point of view of her character in The Dukes of Hazzard, Daisy Duke, and it has several major differences from Sinatra's version. The song's lyrics were changed almost completely as Simpson felt that they did not accurately convey the feelings needed for the film; in the original Sinatra dealt with a cheating boyfriend, while in the new version Simpson explored Daisy Duke's personality and experiences. She rewrote the majority of the lyrics herself, although some elements were retained such as the opening line "You keep saying you got something for me..." and the spoken "Are you ready, boots? Start walkin.

Simpson also added some new music to her version of the song. Whereas the original version did not have a bridge, she created one for the cover. A risqué rap-like/spoken breakdown was added after the bridge. Because of the legalities of songwriting, Simpson has not been credited for the new music or lyrics that she wrote. The production of the song was altered as well. Producers Jimmy Jam and Terry Lewis gave the cover a country-inspired production because of its relationship to the film The Dukes of Hazzard, but they also added a more hip hop-like beat.

Chart performance 

"These Boots Are Made for Walkin peaked at fourteen on the US Billboard Hot 100, and in late 2005 the RIAA certified the single Gold for 500,000 legal downloads or more. Its digital downloads were high, but radio airplay was low. Due to this, it is the song that reached the lowest chart position on the Billboard Hot 100 for a song topping the Hot Digital Songs chart. It reached the top ten on Billboard's Pop 100 chart, and was Simpson's first single to appear on the chart. On July 23, 2005, the song jumped from 8 – 1 on Hot Digital Songs charts in its second week with 43,000 downloads. On December 11, 2006, the single was certified Gold by the RIAA again, this time by Epic Records. In total, the single has received 1 million digital downloads.

Internationally it was a success, reaching top 5 in several European countries. It became her biggest hit in Australia, where it reached number two and remained in the top forty for twenty-four weeks. In Ireland, the single also reached number 2. The song also cracked the top five in the United Kingdom, where it reached number four and is to date, her highest peaking single in Britain. It reached the top ten in the chart European Hot 100 Singles, Belgium, and New Zealand and the top twenty in Austria, Switzerland, and Germany. As the end of the year 2005, the single had sold 69,500 copies in UK.

Music video 

The music video, directed by Brett Ratner, caused controversy because of its sexual imagery. It famously presents "footage of Simpson writhing suggestively against a suds-soaked motor vehicle".

Track listing 
 "These Boots Are Made for Walkin (Radio edit) – 4:10
 "With You" (Live from Universal Amphitheater)
 "Take My Breath Away" (Live from Universal Amphitheater)
 "I Think I'm in Love with You" (Live from Universal Amphitheater)
 "These Boots Are Made for Walkin (Video clip)

Charts

Weekly charts

Year-end charts

Certifications

Release history

Megadeth version 

American thrash metal band Megadeth covered the song on their 1985 debut album Killing Is My Business... and Business Is Good!, which is track four on the original release and eight on the 2002 re-release. Their version (entitled "These Boots") featured altered lyrics, and was produced more as a parody than a true cover.

When the album started selling well, the writer of the song, Lee Hazlewood, began demanding that the song be omitted, due to its being a "perversion of the original". Megadeth guitarist and frontman Dave Mustaine made the point that Hazlewood had been paid royalties for years before he made the complaint, although Mustaine eventually omitted the song anyway from newer pressings of the album. When the album was remixed in 2002, a censored version of the song was included as a bonus track. In 2011, an uncensored live version recorded in 1987 was released as part of the 25th anniversary edition of the album Peace Sells... but Who's Buying?.  In 2018, the song was released with the original Lee Hazlewood lyrics on the remixed and remastered version of Killing Is My Business... and Business Is Good!

In 1987, Megadeth re-recorded the song as part of the soundtrack for Penelope Spheeris' film Dudes, changing the title to "These Boots Are Made for Walkin. This version of the song was the last song the Megadeth recorded with Gar Samuelson and Chris Poland, as the two would be kicked out later in the year for their drug habits (Poland would later record with the band in 1990 and 2003-2004).

Personnel 
Production and performance credits are adapted from the liner notes of Killing Is My Business... and Business Is Good!.

Megadeth
 Dave Mustaine – rhythm guitar, lead vocals
 David Ellefson – bass, backing vocals
 Chris Poland – lead guitar
 Gar Samuelson – drums

Production
 Produced and mixed by Dave Mustaine and Karat Faye
 Co-produced by Megadeth
 Pre-production by Jay Jones

2002 remix and remaster
 Mixed by Bill Kennedy
 Pro Tools by Chris Vrenna
 Mastered by Tom Baker
The Final Kill 2018 remix and remaster
 Mixed by Mark Lewis
 Mastered by Ted Jensen

Olivia Holt version 
In 2013, American actress and singer Olivia Holt released a cover for the Disney Channel Television show Shake it Up on the album, Shake It Up: I Love Dance.

References

External links 
 Collection of over 200 versions

1965 songs
1965 singles
1985 songs
1985 singles
1987 songs
1992 singles
2005 singles
Songs written by Lee Hazlewood
Nancy Sinatra songs
Four Jacks and a Jill songs
Billy Ray Cyrus songs
Jessica Simpson songs
Megadeth songs
Billboard Hot 100 number-one singles
Cashbox number-one singles
Number-one singles in Australia
Number-one singles in Germany
UK Singles Chart number-one singles
Irish Singles Chart number-one singles
RPM Top Singles number-one singles
Number-one singles in South Africa
Music videos directed by Brett Ratner
Songs with feminist themes
Reprise Records singles
Curb Records singles
Columbia Records singles
Songs about parting
American folk rock songs
Music video controversies
Songs written by Jessica Simpson
Go-go songs